The girls' doubles tournament of the 2014 Asian Junior Badminton Championships was held from February 19–23 in Taipei, Taiwan. The defending champion of the last edition were the Chinese pair Huang Dongping and Jia Yifan. Jia teamed-up with last year finalist Chen Qingchen this time as the first seeded, and emerge as the champion after beat their compatriot, the third seeded Du Yue and Li Yinhui in the finals with the score 21–11, 21–18.

Seeded

  Chen Qingchen / Jia Yifan (champion)
  Pacharapun Chochuwong / Chanisa Teachavorasinskun (quarter-final)
  Du Yue / Li Yinhui (final)
  Chang Ching-hui / Chang Hsin-tien (quarter-final)
  Arisa Higashino / Wakana Nagahara (third round)
  Goh Yea Ching / Peck Yen Wei (third round)
  Elaine Chua Yi Ling / Yeo Jiamin (third round)
  Raja Nunina Raja Azlan Shah / Yap Zhen (third round)

Draw

Finals

Top Half

Section 1

Section 2

Section 3

Section 4

Bottom Half

Section 5

Section 6

Section 7

Section 8

References

External links 
Main Draw

2014 Asian Junior Badminton Championships
Junior